Hanste Aansoo is a 1950 Indian Hindi-language romantic comedy film directed by K. B. Lall and starring Madhubala and Motilal, with Gope and Manorama appearing in supporting roles. The music for the film is composed by Ghulam Mohammed. The first Indian film to get an Adults certification, Hanste Aansoo was both a controversial and popular release, receiving praise for Madhubala's performance and notoriety for its bold storyline.

Plot 
Hanste Aansoo revolves around an educated girl, Usha (Madhubala), who is reluctantly married off into a family by her mercenary, drunkard father. Her illiterate husband, Kumar (Motilal), is jealous of Usha's intelligence and frank behaviour, and one day abuses her physically. Unexpectedly, Usha leaves his house, and begins battling for women rights alone. She gives birth to Kumar's son in between, and starts working in a factory, where her male co-workers ridicule her. After several comical  scenes and melodrama, the film ends with Kumar apologising to Usha, and she returning to his house.

Cast 
The main cast of the film included:
 Madhubala as Usha
 Motilal as Kumar, Usha's husband 
 Gope as a factory worker 
 Manorama as Ranjeeta, Usha's supporter
 Jankidas as Usha's father in-law 
 Cuckoo Moray as stage dancer

Soundtrack

Reception

Release and controversy 
Hanste Aansoo was theatrically released in October 1950. It became the first Indian film to be awarded an Adults certification, following the amendment of the original Indian Cinematograph Act (1918) in December 1949. The reasons behind such certification were the film's double-meaning title (laughing tears), and its depiction of a modern age woman fighting for her rights, during the time when women were restricted to household chores, were expected to be completely submitted to their spouses, and had no freedom for education or were allowed to work outside. Many contemporary audience deemed the film's storyline bold and immoral.

Critical reception 
In his filmindia review, Baburao Patel noted that "the picture has nothing objectionable in it to justify this classification but by classifying it this, the Censors have classified themselves as unnecessarily prudish and unintelligent."  Madhubala's comedic-cum-dramatic performance won her significant laurels from critics. Patel commented: "The versatility of this girl seems to endless. In this picture, in addition to her serious and pathetic work, she shows a rare talent for flirting. [...] It is not an easy job to steal a scene from these two seasoned artists (Gope and Motilal), but Madhubala does it."

Box office 
Due to the box-office popularity of Madhubala and the wide media attention she was receiving during this time, Hanste Aansoo was a popular release, running in packed theatres for several weeks. However, the film did not become the kind of success it was expected to be, with trade journalists attributing its failure to the Adult certification.

References

General sources

External links 
 

1950 films
1950s Hindi-language films